The Cal 3-27 is an American sailboat, that was designed by William Lapworth and first built in 1983.

The Cal 3-27 is a development of the Cal 2-27, which was in turn a development of the Cal 27.

The Cal 3-27 was also marketed as the Cal 27 Mk III and then later just as the Cal 27.

Production
The boat was built by Cal Yachts/Jensen Marine in the United States between 1983 and 1985, but it is now out of production.

Design
The Cal 3-27 is a small recreational keelboat, built predominantly of fiberglass, with wood trim. It has a masthead sloop rig, an inboard motor, an internally-mounted spade-type rudder and a fixed fin keel. It displaces  and carries  of ballast.

A tall mast was also an option with a main sail luff ("P" parameter)  higher.

See also
List of sailing boat types

Related development
Cal 27
Cal 2-27

Similar sailboats
Aloha 27
C&C 27
Catalina 27
Catalina 270
Catalina 275 Sport
CS 27
Edel 820
Express 27
Fantasia 27
Halman Horizon
Hotfoot 27
Hullmaster 27
Hunter 27
Hunter 27-2
Hunter 27-3
Island Packet 27
Mirage 27 (Perry)
Mirage 27 (Schmidt)
Mirage 275
O'Day 272
Orion 27-2
Tanzer 27
Watkins 27
Watkins 27P

References

Keelboats
1980s sailboat type designs
Sailing yachts
Sailboat type designs by Bill Lapworth
Sailboat types built by Cal Yachts